The 1946 United States Senate election in Nebraska took place on November 5, 1946. The incumbent Senator, Hugh A. Butler, was re-elected to a second term in a landslide, defeating John E. Mekota.

Democratic primary

Candidates
John E. Mekota, State Senator for the 23rd district
George W. Olsen, Democratic candidate for Governor of Nebraska in 1944

Results

Republican primary

Candidates
Hugh A. Butler, the incumbent Senator
Dwight Griswold, Governor of Nebraska

Results

Results

References 

1946
Nebraska
United States Senate